George Puchta (April 8, 1860 - April 18, 1937) was the assistant Treasurer of the United States from 1911 to 1916 and the Mayor of Cincinnati, Ohio from 1916 to 1917.

Biography
He was born on April 8, 1860 in Cincinnati, Ohio, to Lorentz Puchta and Barbara K. Schmidt. On October 6, 1887 he married Anna M. Meinhardt.

Puchta was as the Cincinnati Park Commissioner from 1909 to 1911.  He was appointed by President William H. Taft as the assistant treasurer for the United States Department of the Treasury from 1911 to 1916.

He was the Mayor of Cincinnati, Ohio from 1916 to 1917.

Puchta was a presidential elector in the 1920, 1924, and 1928 presidential elections.

External links

References

1860 births
1937 deaths
Mayors of Cincinnati
1920 United States presidential electors
1924 United States presidential electors
1928 United States presidential electors